Sukhdeep Singh  is an Indo-Canadian professional boxer born in Chakar village, Ludhiana, Punjab, India. He is a Gold medalist at Sahara 59th Senior Men National Boxing Championships and Super Cup Inter Zonal men National Boxing Championship at Andheri Sports Complex, Mumbai.

He is undefeated in ten professional bouts, with all ten wins, and five wins by knockout.

Early life 
Sukhdeep Singh Bhatti was born on 25 October 1992 in Chakar village in Jagraon, Ludhiana, Punjab.

Career

Professional Matches Record

References

Living people
Indian male boxers
Indian Sikhs
1992 births
Boxers from Haryana